Phrynidius is a genus of beetles in the family Cerambycidae, containing the following species:

 Phrynidius armatus Linsley, 1933
 Phrynidius asper Bates, 1885
 Phrynidius echinoides Breuning, 1940
 Phrynidius echinus Bates, 1880
 Phrynidius inaequalis (Say, 1835)
 Phrynidius salvadorensis Franz, 1954
 Phrynidius singularis Bates, 1880

References

Apomecynini